Helge Valvatne Sandvik (born 15 February 1990) is a Norwegian footballer who plays as a goalkeeper for Haugesund.

Club career
Sandvik was born in Haugesund. He made his senior debut for Aalesund on 7 June 2015 against Haugesund; Aalesund won 2–1.

On 11 November 2015 he signed for Haugsund.

Career statistics

References

1990 births
Living people
People from Haugesund
Norwegian footballers
Eliteserien players
Norwegian First Division players
Norwegian Second Division players
Association football defenders
SK Vard Haugesund players
FK Haugesund players
Aalesunds FK players
Sportspeople from Rogaland